Kafr Shubra Zangi is a village in the Nile Delta of Egypt. It is located about 30 miles northwest of Cairo and 81 miles southeast of Alexandria.

Villages in Egypt